Dragan Mihajlović (born 22 August 1991) is a Swiss professional footballer who plays primarily as a right back for Bellinzona.

Club career
Mihajlović started his career at Bellinzona, in the Italian speaking region of Switzerland. He played his first league match on 26 April 2008, in a 3–0 win to Yverdon, replacing Angelo Raso. He also played the next 2 Challenge League matches as substitute. In the last match of 2008–09 Super League season, Mihajlović made his full Super League debut, substituting Adewale Wahab in the 58th minute. He played the first four out of five league matches as substitute for Bellinzona at the start of 2009–10 season.

A few days after his 18th birthday, on 31 August, Parma, who had recently returned to Serie A, signed him on a permanent deal. After just one season in the Parma primavera team, the 18-year-old Swiss forward moved back to AC Bellinzona on 3 June 2010, signing a 3-year contract.

Levski Sofia
On 12 February 2021, he signed for Bulgarian club Levski Sofia. Mihajlović immediately became a fixture in Levski's starting eleven as a right back and kept his spot for a year until the end of 2021-22 season. His high point at Levski was unquestionably winning the 2021–22 Bulgarian Cup. Mihajlović had a major contribution to the trophy, especially by scoring against Ludogorets Razgrad in the first leg of the semi-final. At the end of the season, Mihajlović and Levski could not reach an agreement for a contract extension and the player left the team.

International
He scored a goal in 2010 UEFA European Under-19 Football Championship qualification. He made his U19 debut on 2 September 2009, a first leg of a two-leg friendly with Georgia national under-19 football team.

Honours

Club
APOEL
 Cypriot Super Cup (1): 2019
Levski Sofia
 Bulgarian Cup (1): 2021–22

References

External links
Profile at Swiss Super League 
 

1991 births
Living people
People from Doboj Region
Serbs of Bosnia and Herzegovina
Swiss people of Bosnia and Herzegovina descent
Swiss people of Serbian descent
Association football fullbacks
Bosnia and Herzegovina footballers
Swiss men's footballers
Switzerland youth international footballers
AC Bellinzona players
FC Chiasso players
FC Lugano players
APOEL FC players
PFC Levski Sofia players
Swiss Challenge League players
Swiss Super League players
Cypriot First Division players
First Professional Football League (Bulgaria) players
Swiss expatriate footballers
Expatriate footballers in Italy
Swiss expatriate sportspeople in Italy
Expatriate footballers in Cyprus
Swiss expatriate sportspeople in Cyprus
Expatriate footballers in Bulgaria
Swiss expatriate sportspeople in Bulgaria